Rotting Out is an American hardcore punk band from the San Pedro community of Los Angeles in California.

History

Formation (2007–2011)
Rotting Out began in 2007 after disbanding from their original band Dogpile. The following year they released their first EP titled This Is Just A Life, via World Won't Listen. In 2009, the band released their second EP, titled Vandalized, via 6131 Records.

Street Prowl (2011–2014)
In 2011, Rotting Out released their first full-length album under 6131 Records, and the first release with bassist, Walter Delgado, on vocals, titled Street Prowl. In early 2013, the band supported The Ghost Inside on their headlining tour alongside Stick to Your Guns and Stray from the Path.

In April 2013, Rotting Out premiered a new song, titled Blade of Rust from their then upcoming sophomore full-length album. The album, titled The Wrong Way, was released on May 7th, 2013 via 6131 Records. On July 12, 2013 Rotting Out released a music video for their song No Clue from their sophomore album. In late 2013, Rotting Out supported The Story So Far on their United States fall tour. In early 2014, Rotting Out announced they were going on a spring headlining tour. The tour consisted of 29 dates across the United States.

Touring, Reckoning EP, and break up (2015)
In early 2015, Rotting Out announced they were going on a co-headlining 20 date tour with Expire. On January 29, 2015 Rotting Out announced they were releasing their third EP via Pure Noise Records, titled Reckoning. The EP was released on March 9, 2015. On March 22, 2015 the band announced that they had broken up. Walter Delgado, the band's frontman, posted on Tumblr stating "ROTTING OUT broke up last Sunday. Thanks to anyone whoever cared. It was a great ride and a privilege. Don’t ask why. Thank you everyone."

The band were included in the Warped Tour 2015 Tour Compilation, with the song "Born".

The band reformed for one final show on December 12th, 2015 in Los Angeles, California.

Legal issues (2016–2017)
In March 2016, vocalist Walter Delgado was arrested in Ohio for transporting an estimated 70 pounds of marijuana. He pled guilty to third-degree felony possession charges. He started his 18-month sentence on July 22, 2016 and was released on November 17, 2017.

Reunion (2018–present)
On February 22, the band announced their first show in almost three years, playing the 2018 Sound And Fury festival. On April 23, 2018, it was announced that Rotting Out would be performing for the This is Hardcore Fest in July. On February 18, 2020 the band announced the release of a new album, Ronin, under Pure Noise Records. The lead single, Unforgiven, was released on February 27.  The album will be released on April 10, 2020.

Band members

 Current members
Walter Delgado – guitar (2007–2009), bass (2009–2010), vocals (2010–2015, 2018–present)
Alfredo “Tank” Dario Pedrozo – guitar (2009–2015, 2018–present)
Jorge Cabrera – drums (2007–2015, 2018–present)
Carlos Morales – guitar (2007–2015, 2018–present)
Benjamin “Benji” Ruiz – bass (2010–2015, 2018–present)

 Past members
Michael Craigs – vocals (2007–2010)
Richard Reyes – bass (2007–2009)

 Touring members
Eddie Gallegos – guitar (2013–2015)

Discography

Studio albums
Street Prowl (2011), 6131 Records
The Wrong Way (2013), 6131 Records
Ronin (2020), Pure Noise Records

EPs and demos
 Demo ‘07 (2007), Self-Released
This Is Just A Life (2008), World Won't Listen
 Vandalized (2009), 6131 Records
Reckoning (2015), Pure Noise Records

Compilation albums
Americas Hardcore (2010), Triple B Records

Singles
"Born"
"Reaper"
"Who Am I"
"Even in His Youth"

References

Hardcore punk groups from California
2007 establishments in California
Pure Noise Records artists